Gustavo Vollmer-Ravelo (died 29 August 1954) was a Cuban tennis player. He was of German descent.

Vollmer appeared in three Davis Cup ties for Cuba, against Mexico and the United States in 1929, then Australia in 1932. His two career singles wins both came against Mexican players and he won a set against Harry Hopman when he played Australia.

In Havana in 1930 he won the men's singles competition at the Central American and Caribbean Games.

See also
List of Cuba Davis Cup team representatives

References

External links
 
 

Year of birth missing
1954 deaths
Cuban male tennis players
Cuban people of German descent
Central American and Caribbean Games medalists in tennis
Central American and Caribbean Games gold medalists for Cuba
Central American and Caribbean Games silver medalists for Cuba
Central American and Caribbean Games bronze medalists for Cuba
Competitors at the 1930 Central American and Caribbean Games
Competitors at the 1935 Central American and Caribbean Games